Preobrazhenovka is a rural locality (a selo) in Pereyaslovsky Selsoviet of Oktyabrsky District, Amur Oblast, Russia. The population was 104 as of 2018. There are 7 streets.

Geography 
Preobrazhenovka is located 39 km west of Yekaterinoslavka (the district's administrative centre) by road. Pereyaslovka is the nearest rural locality.

References 

Rural localities in Oktyabrsky District, Amur Oblast